Spearman Peak is a  summit located in British Columbia, Canada.

Description

Spearman Peak is situated in the Waddington Range of the Coast Mountains, in a remote wilderness area that few visit. Other neighbors include Mount Munday, Grenelle Mountain and Bravo Peak. Precipitation runoff from Spearman Peak's east  slope drains to Bute Inlet via Bravo Glacier → Tiedemann Glacier → Homathko River; and from the west slope to Knight Inlet via Corridor Glacier → Franklin Glacier → Franklin River. Topographic relief is significant as the summit rises 1,365 meters (4,480 feet) above the Tiedemann Glacier in 2.5 kilometers (1.55 mile). The peak's toponym was officially adopted May 1, 1978, by the Geographical Names Board of Canada.

Climate

Based on the Köppen climate classification, Spearman Peak has an ice cap climate. Most weather fronts originate in the Pacific Ocean, and travel east toward the Coast Mountains where they are forced upward by the range (Orographic lift), causing them to drop their moisture in the form of rain or snowfall. As a result, the Coast Mountains experience high precipitation, especially during the winter months in the form of snowfall. Temperatures can drop below −20 °C with wind chill factors  below −30 °C. This climate supports the Corridor, Bravo and Tiedemann glaciers which surround the slopes of Spearman Peak.

See also
 
 Geography of British Columbia

References

External links
 Weather: Spearman Peak
 1978 fatalities: Americanalpineclub.org
 Waddington and Spearman (photo):'' Flickr
 Spearman and Bravo (aerial photo): PBase

Pacific Ranges
Three-thousanders of British Columbia
Waddington Range
Range 2 Coast Land District
Coast Mountains